The IPSC Latin American Championship are IPSC championships hosted in Latin America.

History 
 2010 Buenos Aires, Argentina
 2013 Guayaquil, Ecuador
 2016 August 13 to 20, Barranquilla and Cartagena, Colombia
 2019 Argentina

Champions

Overall category

Lady category

Junior category

Senior category

Super Senior category

References

 Match Results - 2010 IPSC Latin American Handgun Championship, Argentina
 Match Results - 2013 IPSC Latin American Handgun Championship, Ecuador
 Match Results - 2016 IPSC Latin American Handgun Championship, Colombia

IPSC shooting competitions
Shooting sports in North America
Shooting sports in South America
Sports competitions in the Americas